Jie Schöpp (born 25 January 1968), née Shi, is a Chinese-born, German international table tennis player.

Table tennis career
She won a bronze medal for Germany at the 1997 World Table Tennis Championships in the Corbillon Cup (women's team event) with Christina Fischer, Elke Schall, Olga Nemeș and Nicole Struse.

She represented Germany at the 1996, 2000, and 2004 Summer Olympics.

References

1968 births
Living people
Table tennis players from Baoding
German female table tennis players
Chinese emigrants to Germany
Chinese female table tennis players
Table tennis players at the 2000 Summer Olympics
Table tennis players at the 1996 Summer Olympics
Table tennis players at the 2004 Summer Olympics
Olympic table tennis players of Germany
Naturalised table tennis players
World Table Tennis Championships medalists